Wilkin Ward (1884–1958) was an English footballer who played in the Football League for Bradford (Park Avenue) and Oldham Athletic.

References

1884 births
1958 deaths
English footballers
Association football forwards
English Football League players
Oldham Athletic A.F.C. players
Bradford (Park Avenue) A.F.C. players
Rossendale United F.C. players